Marta Ehrlich (27 April 1910 – 15 March 1980) was a Croatian painter.

Ehrlich was born in Zagreb on 27 April 1910. She was raised in a wealthy Jewish family of Ernest and Erna Laura Ehrlich. Her father was a building contractor and her mother was a school teacher. The Ehrlich's were a notable Zagreb family, her uncle was architect Hugo Ehrlich and her aunt was the painter and Holocaust survivor Mira Klobučar. Before  World War II, Ehrlich lived with her parents and two siblings at the Villa in Tuškanac which was designed by her uncle Hugo Ehrlich. She attended elementary and high school in Zagreb. Ehrlich graduated from the Academy of Fine Arts, University of Zagreb in 1934. After graduation, Ehrlich went to Paris in 1935, where she perfected her skills in various painting techniques. She stayed in Paris for three years, before returning to Zagreb. After her return to Zagreb, she took private lessons from Vladimir Becić. Ehrlich's early work was marked by Becić's influence. During her career, Ehrlich created a remarkable 227 paintings which constitute an invaluable section of Croatian visual art. Ehrlich was married to Kamilo Tompa, a painter with whom she lived and worked at the house on Šubićeva street. She painted until 1978, two years before she took her own life. Ehrlich was buried at the Mirogoj Cemetery as Marta Tompa.

References

Bibliography

 

1910 births
1980 deaths
Artists from Zagreb
Croatian Jews
Austro-Hungarian Jews
Croatian Austro-Hungarians
Jewish painters
Jewish women painters
Academy of Fine Arts, University of Zagreb alumni
Artists who committed suicide
Burials at Mirogoj Cemetery
Croatian women artists
20th-century Croatian painters
20th-century women artists
1980 suicides
Suicides in Yugoslavia